Air Chief Marshal Sir Joseph Charles French,  (born 15 July 1949), often known as Sir Joe French, is a retired senior Royal Air Force officer who was the last Air Officer Commanding-in-Chief RAF Strike Command (2006–07).

RAF career
French joined the Royal Air Force (RAF) in 1967 and qualified as a helicopter pilot, flying Wessex, Puma and Chinook. Postings included Sharjah, Hong Kong, Germany and an operational tour of Northern Ireland in 1972, for which he was Mentioned in Despatches. He was commanding officer of No. 7 Squadron (Chinook) at RAF Odiham, where he was later station commander (1989–91).

French attended the RAF Staff College and the Royal College of Defence Studies. Staff postings included aide-de-camp to the Chief of the Defence Staff, and Personal Staff Officer to the Air Officer Commanding-in-Chief Strike Command. He served on the staff of the Central Trials and Tactics Organisation, and was Head of the RAF Presentation Team.

French served as Director of Air Force Staff Duties, and as Assistant Chief of Defence Staff (Policy), before being appointed Director-General of Intelligence Collection. He was Chief of Defence Intelligence (CDI) from 2000, and it was while he was CDI that the controversial September Dossier was drafted which attempted to assess the state of Iraq's weapons of mass destruction. He was appointed Commander-in-Chief Personnel and Training Command and Air Member for Personnelin 2003 and Air Officer Commanding-in-Chief RAF Strike Command in 2006.

French was appointed a Commander of the Order of the British Empire in the 1991 New Year Honours, and a Knight Commander of the Order of the Bath in the 2003 New Year Honours.

Retirement
Upon his retirement in 2007, French became President of the RAF Servicing Commando and Tactical Supply Wing Association.

References

|-

|-

|-

|-

1949 births
Commanders of the Order of the British Empire
Fellows of the Royal Aeronautical Society
Knights Commander of the Order of the Bath
Living people
Graduates of the Royal College of Defence Studies
Royal Air Force air marshals